Admiral Bennett may refer to:

Andrew Carl Bennett (1889–1971), U.S. Navy rear admiral
Chris Bennett (admiral) (born 1937), South African Navy rear admiral
Jennifer Bennett (fl. 1990s–2010s), Canadian Forces Naval Reserve rear admiral
Paul Bennett (Royal Navy officer) (fl. 1980s–2020s), British Royal Navy vice admiral